Round and Round may refer to:

"Round and Round" (Shapiro/Stallman song), 1957
"Round and Round" (Ratt song), 1984
"Round and Round" (Tevin Campbell song), 1990
"Round and Round" (Ariel Pink's Haunted Graffiti song), 2010
"Round and Round" (Imagine Dragons song), 2012
"Round and Round" (Tinkara Kovač song), 2014
"Round & Round" (New Order song), 1989
"Round & Round" (Twinz song), 1995
"Round & Round" (Selena Gomez & the Scene song), 2010
"'Round and 'Round (Merry Go 'Round of Love)", a 1988 song by Guy
"Round and Round", a 1960 song written by Tom Jones and Harvey Schmidt
"Round and Round", a 1974 song by The Strawbs from the album Hero and Heroine
"Round and Round", a 1975 song by Aerosmith from the album Toys in the Attic
"Round and Round", a 1982 song by Lionel Richie from the album Lionel Richie
"Round and Round", a 1984 song by Spandau Ballet from the album Parade
"Round and Round", a 1988 song by Frozen Ghost from the album Nice Place to Visit
"Round and Round", a 1991 song by Kim Hill from the album Brave Heart
"Round and Round", a 1997 song by Mary J. Blige from the album Share My World
"Round and Round", a 1997 song by Earth, Wind & Fire from the album In the Name of Love
"Round and Round", a 1997 song by LSG from the album Levert.Sweat.Gill
"Round and Round", a 1999 song by Atmosphere from the album Headshots: Se7en
"Round and Round", a 1999 song by Status Quo from the album Under the Influence
"Round and Round", a 1999 song by Dave Hollister from the album Ghetto Hymns
"Round and Round", a 2003 song by Haystak from the album Return of the Mak Million
"Round and Round", a 2003 song by Nate Dogg from the album Nate Dogg
"Round and Round", a 2004 song by Fabolous from the album Real Talk
"Round and Round", a 2005 song by BodyRockers from the album BodyRockers
"Round and Round", a 2005 song by Amiel from the album These Ties
"Round and Round", a 2006 song by Nathan from the album Masterpiece
"Round and Round", a 2007 song by Jagged Edge from the album Baby Makin' Project
"Round and Round", a 2010 song by Kenny Chesney from the album Hemingway's Whiskey
"Round and Round", a 2011 song by 3 Doors Down from the album Time of My Life
"Round and Round (Bingeul Bingeul)", a 2010 song by U-KISS from the album Only One
"Round & Round", a 1972 song by the Delfonics from the album Tell Me This Is a Dream
"Round & Round", a 1972 song by Edgar Winter from the album They Only Come Out at Night
"Round & Round", a 1977 song by Gryphon from the album Treason
"Round & Round", a 1996 song by 702 from the album No Doubt
"Round & Round", a 1998 song by Bonnie Raitt from the album Fundamental
"Round & Round", a 2000 song by Kottonmouth Kings from the album High Society
"Round & Round", a 2001 song by Hi-Tek from the album Hi-Teknology
"Round & Round", a 2002 song by All-4-One from the album A41
"Round & Round", a 2002 song by Los Lobos from the album Good Morning Aztlán
"Round & Round", a 2006 song by Toby Lightman from the album Bird on a Wire
"Round & Round", a 2015 song by Sisqó from the album Last Dragon
"Round & Round", a 2020 song by Trey Songz from the album Back Home
"Round & Round (It Won't Be Long)", a 1969 song by Neil Young from the album Everybody Knows This Is Nowhere

See also
Round and Around (disambiguation)
"Round Round", a song by Sugababes
"Around and Around", a song by Chuck Berry, recorded by David Bowie as "Round and Round"
 "You Spin Me Round (Like a Record)", a song by Dead or Alive
  ("Round and Round"), Welsh soap opera